Marek Tomsik competed for Slovakia in the men's standing volleyball event at the 1996 Summer Paralympics (silver medal) and the 2000 Summer Paralympics (bronze medal).

See also 
 Slovakia at the 1996 Summer Paralympics
 Slovakia at the 2000 Summer Paralympics

References

External links
 

Living people
Year of birth missing (living people)
Place of birth missing (living people)
Slovak men's volleyball players
Paralympic silver medalists for Slovakia
Paralympic bronze medalists for Slovakia
Paralympic medalists in volleyball
Volleyball players at the 1996 Summer Paralympics
Volleyball players at the 2000 Summer Paralympics
Medalists at the 1996 Summer Paralympics
Medalists at the 2000 Summer Paralympics